Tromøy (historic: Tromø) is a former municipality in the old Aust-Agder county in Norway. The  municipality existed from 1878 until its dissolution in 1992. The municipal area is now part of the municipality of Arendal in Agder county. The administrative centre was the village of Brekka, where the historic Tromøy Church is located. The municipality encompassed all of the island of Tromøya as well as many smaller surrounding islands such as Merdø, Gjesøya, Skilsøy, and Tromlingene.

The municipality had two churches: the centuries-old Tromøy Church and the relatively new Færvik Church. Some of the main villages in Tromøy were Færvik, Brekka, Brattekleiv, Sandnes, Revesand, and Pusnes. The municipality was connected to the mainland by the Tromøy Bridge, the only road connection to Tromøya. The other islands of Tromøy were only accessible by boat.

History
The municipality of Tromøy was established on 1 May 1878 when the municipality of Østre Moland was divided into three municipalities: Tromøy (population: 2,320), Barbu (population: 4,874), and Østre Moland (population: 2,524). On 1 January 1992 there was a major municipal merger where the following municipalities were merged into the municipality of Arendal: Tromøy (population: 4,711), Moland (population: 8,148), Øyestad (population: 8,679), Hisøy (population: 4,026), and the town of Arendal (population: 12,478).

Name
The municipality (originally the parish) was named after its island Tromøya. Historically it was spelled Tromø, but more recently it has been spelled Tromøy. The name comes from the Old Norse , which means "rim", "edge", or "border". The suffix -ø or øy means "island".

Coat of arms
The coat of arms was granted on 23 August 1985 and in use until the municipal merger on 1 January 1992. The official blazon is "Per fess nebuly argent and azure". This means the arms have a field (background) that is divided in half horizontally with a nebuly line. The top part has a tincture of argent which means it is commonly colored white, but if it is made out of metal, then silver is used. The bottom part is colored blue. The design is meant to mimic the coastline near the village of Brekka, which is characterised by large rounded boulders protruding out into the sea. This landscape dates back to the Ice Age and was used to model the division line in the coat of arms. The arms are also canting since the name of the municipality is derived from the word "Trom" which means "edge" or "rim", referring to the division line on the arms and the boulders along the sea. The arms were designed by Anne Marie Falck.

Government
All municipalities in Norway, including Tromøy, are responsible for primary education (through 10th grade), outpatient health services, senior citizen services, unemployment and other social services, zoning, economic development, and municipal roads. The municipality was governed by a municipal council of elected representatives, which in turn elected a mayor.

Municipal council
The municipal council  of Tromøy was made up of 21 representatives that were elected to four year terms.  The party breakdown of the final municipal council was as follows:

Media gallery

See also
List of former municipalities of Norway

References

External links

Arendal
Populated places established in 1878
Populated places disestablished in 1992
Former municipalities of Norway
1878 establishments in Norway
1992 disestablishments in Norway